Cyclin-T1 is a protein that in humans is encoded by the CCNT1 gene.

Function 

The protein encoded by this gene belongs to the highly conserved cyclin family, whose members are characterized by a dramatic periodicity in protein abundance through the cell cycle. Cyclins function as regulators of CDK kinases. Different cyclins exhibit distinct expression and degradation patterns that contribute to the temporal coordination of each mitotic event. This cyclin tightly associates with CDK9 kinase, and was found to be a major subunit of the transcription elongation factor p-TEFb. The kinase complex containing this cyclin and the elongation factor can interact with, and act as a cofactor of human immunodeficiency virus type 1 (HIV-1) Tat protein, and was shown to be both necessary and sufficient for full activation of viral transcription. This cyclin and its kinase partner were also found to be involved in the phosphorylation and regulation of the carboxy-terminal domain (CTD) of the largest RNA polymerase II subunit.

Interactions 

Cyclin T1 has been shown to interact with the following:

 Aryl hydrocarbon receptor 
 CDK9 
 Granulin 
 HEXIM1 
 Myc 
 NUFIP1
 Promyelocytic leukemia protein

References

Further reading